Ravenscraig Castle, also known as the Craig of Inverugie, is a ruined 15th-century L-shaped tower-house north-west of Peterhead, Aberdeenshire, Scotland. It is a scheduled ancient monument.

The castle was the seat of the barony of Torthorston, held by the Cheynes family, and passed to the Keiths in the mid-14th century. A licence was granted to build a new castle in May 1491, with the castle built on the banks of the Ugie and defended by a moat.

It is thought that King James VI of Scotland visited the castle in 1589 to attend the wedding of Rebecca Keith and Sir James Gordon of Lesmoir. At that time the castle belonged to John Keith of Ravenscraig, whose half-brother William Keith of Delny was a courtier and diplomat who had tried to save the life of Mary, Queen of Scots, in 1587.

Most of the castle's decorative features and dressed stone have been robbed; however, the vaulted ground floor and principal apartments on the first are still visible. "A circular stair in the re-entrant angle rose originally above the wall head into a turret."

Literary inspiration
The Mitherless Bairn by William Thom
William Thom was inspired to write this deathless poem after sighting a "pretty governess" in the castle grounds in 1844.

References

External links
 Ravenscraig Castle Virtual Tour

History of Aberdeenshire
Castles in Aberdeenshire
Scheduled Ancient Monuments in Aberdeenshire
1491 establishments in Scotland